Khushiyon kii Gullak Aashi is an Indian television series that aired Monday through Saturday nights on Sony Pal from  1 September 2014  and ended on 5 December 2014 due to low TRP. It starred Naman Shaw and Helly Shah in lead roles. The show was produced by Diamond Pictures and Miloni Movie. The story revolves around aashi a bubbly and full of life girl. One thing missing from her life is her parents’ love they have no time for her. Aashi goes on journey of adopting parents and the difficulties she faces in the journey.

Plot

It is about Aashi, a girl who likes helping anyone in need. Vishesh Dubey, who is a lawyer and falls in love with her. There is a couple who are prabha and Vishnu who aashi adopts as her parents because her parents don't love her and the couple does not receive love from their son. To help them there are other characters like Sahil, buntu and Kanu who are sister brother. After solving few cases together aashi also falls in love with vishesh but does not realize it, she is made to realize by prabha and Vishnu then she (aashi) proposes vishesh, and they get engaged.

Cast

 Helly Shah as Aashi vishesh dubey- Prabha and Vishnu' s daughter- best friend  of Sahil,Kaanu,and buntu later becomes sister-in-law.Wife of Vishesh Dubey.
 Naman Shaw as Vishesh Dubey-eldest brother of Sahil, Kaanu, and buntu.Husband of Aashi.
 Abhishek Sharma as Sahil Sharma
 Priyanka Joshi as Kaanu
 Rohitash Gaud as Vishnu
 Rakesh Kukreti .
 Megha Gupta as Jigyasa Ravindra Tyagi
 Nishigandha Wad as Prabha

References

Indian drama television series
2014 Indian television series debuts
2014 Indian television series endings
Sony Pal original programming